is a Japanese former professional baseball player.

References

External links
 
 

1981 births
Living people
Baseball people from Gunma Prefecture
Japanese expatriate baseball players in Taiwan
Nippon Professional Baseball pitchers
Nippon Ham Fighters players
Hokkaido Nippon-Ham Fighters players
Hanshin Tigers players
Sinon Bulls players
Tokyo Yakult Swallows players
Lamigo Monkeys players
Nippon Professional Baseball Rookie of the Year Award winners
Japanese expatriate baseball players in the Dominican Republic
Gigantes del Cibao players
People from Ōta, Gunma